The 2014–15 season was the 90th season of competitive football in Poland. The domestic season began on 9 July 2014, with the start of the Polish SuperCup.

League competitions

Ekstraklasa

Polish Cup

Polish SuperCup

Polish clubs in Europe

Legia Warsaw

2014–15 UEFA Champions League

2014–15 UEFA Europa League

Lech Poznań
2014–15 UEFA Europa League

Ruch Chorzów
2014–15 UEFA Europa League

Zawisza Bydgoszcz
2014–15 UEFA Europa League

National teams

Poland national team

Poland U-21 national team

Poland U-20 national team

Poland U-19 national team

Poland U-18 national team

Poland U-17 national team

Poland U-16 national team

Poland U-15 national team

Women's football

Poland women's national team

Polish women's clubs in Europe

Medyk Konin

Notes and references